Sajda Ahmed (Bengali: সাজদা আহমেদ) is an Indian politician and a social worker. She was elected to Lok Sabha in a by poll from Uluberia parliamentary constituency of West Bengal by margin of over 4.74 lakh votes and become member of Sixteenth Lok Sabha. She elected in 2nd Term in 2019 to 17th Loksabha

References

http://myneta.info/ls2014/candidate.php?candidate_id=10050
http://www.newindianexpress.com/nation/2017/dec/29/west-bengal-trinamool-congress-announces-candidates-for-uluberia-and-noapara-assembly-by-polls-1739692.html

West Bengal politicians
1962 births
Living people
Politicians from Kolkata
India MPs 2019–present
Trinamool Congress politicians from West Bengal
Lok Sabha members from West Bengal
Women in West Bengal politics
Women members of the Lok Sabha
21st-century Indian politicians
21st-century Indian women politicians